James Blake and Mark Merklein were the defending champions but lost in the first round to Jeff Coetzee and Chris Haggard.

Rick Leach and Brian MacPhie won in the final 6–3, 6–1 against Coetzee and Haggard.

Seeds

  Yves Allegro /  Robbie Koenig (semifinals)
  James Blake /  Mark Merklein (first round)
  Jordan Kerr /  Todd Perry (first round)
  Rick Leach /  Brian MacPhie (champions)

Draw

External links
 Doubles draw

Tennis Channel Open
2004 ATP Tour
2004 Tennis Channel Open